Thomas Anthony Parker (4 August 1988 – 30 March 2022) was an English singer, widely known as a member of the boy band the Wanted. In 2013, Parker appeared with his bandmates in the E! channel reality television series The Wanted Life. Alongside the Wanted, Parker released three studio albums and achieved two number one singles on the UK Singles Chart. After the band's hiatus in 2014, he embarked on a solo career. 

In October 2020, at the age of 32, Parker was diagnosed with an inoperable brain tumour. The Wanted reunited in September 2021, but after a sudden deterioration in his condition, Parker died of complications from glioblastoma on 30 March 2022, at the age of 33.

Early life
Parker was born and grew up in Bolton, Greater Manchester. He learned to play the guitar at the age of sixteen after trying out his older brother's guitar. He then went on to audition for The X Factor, but did not get past the first round. He went to Manchester Metropolitan University and studied Geography, but dropped out in pursuit of a professional singing career. Parker joined a Take That tribute band known as Take That II and toured Northern England, before joining the Wanted in 2009.

Career

In 2009 a mass audition was held by Jayne Collins to form a boy band, after successfully launching Parade and the Saturdays. Parker auditioned and was selected as one of five members, along with Nathan Sykes, Siva Kaneswaran, Max George, and Jay McGuiness out of the thousands of others who auditioned. The band was formed and together they worked on their debut album before finding a name for their band, the Wanted. Their debut single "All Time Low" was released on 25 July 2010 and debuted at number one on the UK Singles Chart. They went on to have further hits with songs like "Heart Vacancy", "Glad You Came", "Chasing the Sun" and "I Found You". In 2013, in support of a crossover appeal to the American music market, the group starred in their own reality series on E!. The series, The Wanted Life only aired for one season.

The Wanted announced their decision to break up in January 2014. Parker, as a member of the band has sold over 12 million records worldwide.

Parker was also an avid DJ, and collaborated with Richard Rawson on a track called "Fireflies", which was released in August 2014. In May 2015, he took part in the UK version of Celebrity MasterChef and was eliminated during the semi-finals of the competition. In October 2015, he released a solo single titled "Undiscovered" along with his own website and tour dates. In February 2016 it was confirmed that he was to replace Tina Hobley on the Channel 4 show The Jump after she fell on her arm and dislocated her elbow. He eventually finished third in the series.

In 2017 Parker was cast as Danny Zuko in the UK tour of the musical Grease. He put his wedding on hold for the tour.

Personal life
Parker married Kelsey Hardwick in 2018. Their daughter was born in July 2019 and their son was born in October 2020.

Illness and death
On 12 October 2020, Parker announced that he had been diagnosed with an inoperable grade 4 glioblastoma, a type of brain tumour. He suffered a seizure in July and was put on the waiting list for an MRI scan, later suffering a seizure on a family trip. In January 2021, Parker posted to Instagram that his tumour had been "significantly reduced" and that he was continuing his treatment. In September, Parker held a special charity concert at the Royal Albert Hall, in aid of Stand Up to Cancer. The event was called "Inside My Head", and featured artists such as Becky Hill, McFly, Liam Payne, and the first performance with his Wanted bandmates since they announced their hiatus in 2014. On 3 November, Parker announced on Twitter that his brain tumour was stable: "had the results from my latest scan ... and I'm delighted to say it is stable."

Despite his previous claims of stability, Parker later experienced a sudden deterioration in his condition, and died of complications from glioblastoma at St Christopher's Hospice in Bromley, London, on 30 March 2022, at the age of 33. Tributes to Parker were paid by his Wanted bandmates: Max George said he was "heartbroken beyond words"; and Nathan Sykes stated that "[their] lives would never be the same" whilst Siva Kaneswaran said he was "grateful that [he] had a chance to witness [Parker's] true courage". Numerous other celebrities and public figures paid tribute. Additionally, an episode of Pointless Celebrities, which he and George had recorded the previous year, was brought forward in the schedules and was dedicated to him.

Parker's funeral took place at St Francis of Assisi Church in Petts Wood on 20 April.

Discography

Filmography

Awards and nominations

References

External links 

 
 Archive of official website
 

1988 births
2022 deaths
21st-century English male singers
21st-century English singers
Deaths from brain cancer in England
Deaths from glioblastoma
English pop singers
Musicians from the Metropolitan Borough of Bolton
Singers from Manchester
The Wanted members